Events in the year 2018 in the Czech Republic.

Incumbents
 President – Miloš Zeman
 Prime Minister – Andrej Babiš

Events

January – In the Czech presidential election, 2018, Miloš Zeman defeated Jiří Drahoš and was reelected for a second term in office.

Sports
9 to 25 February – Czech Republic participated at the 2018 Winter Olympics in PyeongChang, South Korea, with 93 competitors in 13 sports

9 to 18 March – Czech Republic participated at the 2018 Winter Paralympics in PyeongChang, South Korea

Deaths

1 January – , actor, tap dancer and presenter (b. 1990)

2 January – , historian and academic (b. 1924).

2 January – , puppet theatre director and theorist (b. 1947)

8 January – Vojtěch Lindaur, journalist and record producer (b. 1957).

2 March – Ota Filip, novelist and journalist (b. 1930)

16 March – Otomar Kvěch, composer (b. 1950).

17 March – Zdeněk Mahler, writer, musicologist, pedagogue and screenwriter (b. 1928)

22 March – Jan Kantůrek, translator (b. 1948)

22 March – , Holocaust survivor, Germanist and translator, Order of Tomáš Garrigue Masaryk recipient (b. 1929).

24 March – , art restorer (b. 1943).

13 April – Miloš Forman, film director (One Flew Over the Cuckoo's Nest, Amadeus, The People vs. Larry Flynt), Oscar winner (1975, 1984) (b. 1932).

20 April – Pavel Šrut, poet (b. 1940)

1 May – Pavel Pergl, footballer (b. 1977).

20 May – Jaroslav Brabec, shot putter (b. 1949)

24 June – Pavel Vranský, brigadier general, World War II veteran (b. 1921).

11 July – Václav Glazar, actor (b. 1952).

References

 
2010s in the Czech Republic
Years of the 21st century in the Czech Republic
Czech Republic
Czech Republic